Rocky Creek is a stream in southeastern Shannon County in the Ozarks of southern Missouri. It is a tributary of the Current River.

Rocky Creek was so named for the rocky character of its creek bed.

See also
List of rivers of Missouri

References

Rivers of Shannon County, Missouri
Rivers of Missouri